John "Jake" Edwards (1912-2005) was a championship winning football player in the Canadian Football League for one season for the Toronto Argonauts. He also had a long and praise-worthy career as a football player and educator/administrator with the Queen's Golden Gaels.

Born in Ottawa, he played briefly with his hometown Rough Riders before attending University of Michigan. He returned to Canada and studied at Queen's University, where he played football and was one of the famed "Fearless 14" Golden Gaels that won the 1934 Yates Cup.

In 1937 he played for the Toronto Argonauts, competing in all 6 regular season and 3 playoff games, helping them win the 25th Grey Cup.

He later returned to Queen's University, becoming in 1938 a co-founder and first director of the School of Physical and Health Education.

A lifelong active sportsman and fan, he was inducted into the Kingston and District Sports Hall of Fame in 1997. He died July 26, 2005.

References
 Kingston and District Sports Hall of Fame profile
 1937 Grey Cup – Toronto Argonauts 4, Winnipeg Blue Bombers 3
 CFLAPEDIA - See: Edwards (1930)
 Queen’s celebrates the life of a legend: university athlete, coach, teacher and fan dies at age 93
 2011 Toronto Argonauts Media Guide: All Time Roster, page 202

1912 births
2005 deaths
Canadian football people from Ottawa
Players of Canadian football from Ontario
Toronto Argonauts players
Queen's Golden Gaels football players
Ottawa Rough Riders players
 University of Michigan alumni